"If You Leave Me Tonight I'll Cry" is a song made famous by country music singer Jerry Wallace. Originally released in 1972, the song was the only number-one song during Wallace's recording career.

In popular culture
The song was featured prominently as part of the plot in the third and final "segment" of a 1972 episode of Night Gallery: "The Tune in Dan's Cafe."

Charts

References

1972 singles
Jerry Wallace songs
Decca Records singles